The Southern Miss Golden Eagles college football team represents the University of Southern Mississippi in the West Division of the Sun Belt Conference (SBC). The Golden Eagles competes as part of the NCAA Division I Football Bowl Subdivision. The program has had 22 head coaches, and 2 interim head coaches, since it began play during the 1912 season. Since December 2020, Will Hall has served as head coach at Southern Miss.

The Golden Eagles have played more than 1,050 games over 103seasons. In that time, eight coaches have led Southern Miss in postseason bowl games: Reed Green, Thad Vann, Bobby Collins, Curley Hallman, Jeff Bower, Larry Fedora, Todd Monken, and Jay Hopson. Four of those coaches also won conference championships: Green captured one and Vann two as a member of the Gulf States Conference; and Bower captured four and Fedora one as a member of Conference USA.

Vann is the leader in seasons coached and games won, with 139 victories during his 20 years with the program. Green has the highest winning percentage of those who have coached more than one game, with .735. Ellis Johnson has the lowest winning percentage of those who have coached more than one game, with .000. Of the 22 different head coaches who have led the Golden Eagles, Vann has been inducted into the College Football Hall of Fame.

Key

Coaches

Notes

References 

Southern Miss

Southern Miss Golden Eagles football coaches